Cytochrome P450, family 14, also known as CYP14, is a nematoda cytochrome P450 monooxygenase family. The first gene identified in this family is the CYP14A1 from the Caenorhabditis elegans. The function of most genes in this family is unknown.

References 

Animal genes
14
Protein families